Talitsa is a town and the administrative center of Talitsky District of Sverdlovsk Oblast, Russia, located on the right bank of the Pyshma River (Ob's basin), near the Yekaterinburg–Tyumen segment of Trans-Siberian Railway,  east of Yekaterinburg. Population:

History
It was founded in 1732 as a settlement near a large liquor factory. The settlement was granted town status in 1942.

Economy
Food, biochemical and pharmaceutical (chlortetracycline) industries have traditionally been strong in Talitsa. Forestry occupies another large section of the town's economy. The Talitsa Forestry College hosts a large collection of plants in its arboretum downtown Talitsa. The town is also famous for its handmade carpets.

Transportation
The city can reached by train, which stops in nearby Troitsky, or by car via Moscow-Peking road.

Notable people
Nikolai Ivanovich Kuznetsov, Soviet intelligence officer during World War II
Sergey Nikolsky, mathematician

References

Cities and towns in Sverdlovsk Oblast
Kamyshlovsky Uyezd